John Thomas Wilson (born 8 March 1897) was an English footballer who played as a wing half.

Club career
Born in Leadgate, County Durham, he played for Leadgate St Ives and Leadgate United as a youth and served as a bombardier in the Royal Field Artillery during the First World War. His first professional club was Newcastle United, with whom he had a brief spell with due to breaking both his legs while at St. James' Park. He became player-manager of Leadgate Park at the age of 24, in 1920.

In 1922, he moved to Durham City, scoring five goals in eight matches, attracting the attention of Stockport County. He stayed with County for four seasons, eventually changing positions from an inside forward to a half back.

In September 1926, he was sold to Manchester United. Early in his career at Old Trafford, he was sent off in a reserve match, which resulted in a two-month suspension. However, he proved to be a trusty stalwart in the defence, and was noted for his enthusiasm and an immense capacity for hard work. He was captain of the side during the 1928–1929 season. He was at Old Trafford for six seasons, having made he made 140 appearances and scoring 3 goals. He was sold to Bristol City in 1932.

He lasted a season with the Robins, before returning to his hometown of Leadgate, unable to find another club. In 1947, he was employed in the licensing trade in Tynemouth.

References

1897 births
Year of death missing
People from Leadgate, County Durham
Footballers from County Durham
English footballers
Association football wing halves
Newcastle United F.C. players
Leadgate Park F.C. players
Durham City A.F.C. players
Stockport County F.C. players
Manchester United F.C. players
Bristol City F.C. players
English Football League players
British Army personnel of World War I
Royal Field Artillery soldiers